Perl Design Patterns Book is an online textbook about Perl style and design and analysis. The contents are licensed under GNU Free Documentation License.

External links
 Perl Design Patterns (wiki)
 Perl Design Patterns Book in Savannah

Books about Perl